Blackwood railway station is located on the Belair line in Adelaide. Situated 18 kilometres from Adelaide station, it is in the southern foothills suburb of Blackwood.

History
Blackwood station opened in 1883 with the opening of the Adelaide to Aldgate section of the Adelaide-Melbourne line. On 18 June 1928, it became the temporary terminus of the double track section from Eden Hills. On 24 June 1928 it was extended through to Belair. In 1940, a footbridge was added.

Blackwood is one of the busiest stations on the Belair line, and it is the only station on the line to have a bus interchange with connections available with many routes. Also, it and Mitcham are the only stations between Goodwood and Belair to have more than one platform in use to allow services to pass. Blackwood is also the only station where trains mostly use the right platform as opposed to the left. After Blackwood station, between Blackwood and Belair there is no loop to allow more than one train to pass.

In 1995, as part of the One Nation Adelaide-Melbourne line gauge conversion project, a standard gauge line was laid on the eastern side of the station. In 2009, the station was given a facelift.

Services by platforms

Buses
Bus transfers include buses: 173, 195, 196, 605, 893, 894, 894H, G30f.

References

Railway stations in Adelaide
Railway stations in Australia opened in 1883
South Australian Heritage Register